William Elbert Gay (October 27, 1941  February 23, 2012) was an American writer of novels, short stories and essays.

Early life
Gay was born in Hohenwald, Tennessee. After high school, Gay joined the United States Navy and served during the Vietnam War. After returning to the States, he lived in both New York City and Chicago before returning to Lewis County, Tennessee, where he lived from 1978 until his death.

Even though he had been writing since the age of fifteen, Gay did not publish anything until 1998, when two of his short stories were accepted by literary magazines. Before then, Gay made his living as a carpenter, drywall hanger, and house painter.

Career
In 1999, Gay published his first novel, The Long Home. Gay was recognized and marketed as "the real thing," a new Larry Brown.

The novel won the 1999 James A. Michener Memorial Prize and sold well enough to start a bidding war for his second novel. Provinces of Night was published in late 2000 and confirmed Gay's knack for storytelling. It formed the basis for the 2010 independent film Bloodworth. In 2002, Gay published a collection of stories, I Hate to See That Evening Sun Go Down, and in 2006 Gay's third novel, Twilight was published. With its story of a kinky undertaker who hires a hitman to kill a nosy teenager, Twilight is Gay's most straightforward Southern Gothic novel.

Gay's stories have been anthologized extensively, and as well as his fictional work, Gay frequently contributed essays on music to magazines such as Paste and Oxford American.

William Gay was named a 2007 USA Ford Foundation Fellow and awarded a $50,000 grant by United States Artists, a public charity that supports and promotes the work of American artists.

Lost works
 
In 2015, it was announced that two of his lost novels had been found and would be published: Little Sister Death was published in the autumn of 2015, and The Lost Country was published in late 2016. In June 2017, the Novel Stoneburner was published by Anomolaic Press.

Themes

Gay's fiction is almost always set in the rural South of the 1940s and 50s. This alone lends it an air of old-fashioned authenticity similar to that of William Faulkner and Flannery O'Connor. Gay's South is as darkly violent and as dirt-poor as anything by Erskine Caldwell or O'Connor. Gay's novels take the shape of coming-of-age stories. His three novels depict young idealistic boys that turn into men through a series of violent encounters in which they must make tough moral decisions to face and defeat the evil they are up against. Another recurrent theme in Gay's fiction is his preoccupation with "plain folk," such as carpenters and bootleggers, who are frequently the kin of the young men coming of age. In addition, Provinces of Night deals with another issue peculiar to the Upper South of the period, the condemnation of private property for the development of a new dam by the Tennessee Valley Authority.

Death
Gay died on February 23, 2012, presumably of a heart attack. He was 70.

Works
1999: The Long Home  (MacMurray & Beck).
2000: Provinces of Night  (Doubleday).
2002: I Hate to See That Evening Sun Go Down  (Free Press).
2006: Wittgenstein's Lolita/The Iceman: Short Stories from William Gay  (Wild Dog Press).
This little collection also includes an afterword by J. M. White that provides the most accurate biographical information on Gay available so far.
2006: Twilight  (MacAdam/Cage).
2010: Time Done Been Won't Be No More: Collected Prose  (Wild Dog Press).
2015: Little Sister Death  published posthumously  (Dzanc Books).
2018: Stoneburner  published posthumously  (Anomolaic Press).
2018: The Lost Country  published posthumously  (Dzanc Books).
2021: Fugitives of the Heart  published posthumously  (Livingston Press).
2022: Stories from the Attic  published posthumously  (Dzanc Books).

Film adaptation of The Long Home

It was announced on April 6, 2015, that James Franco would direct, produce—through Rabbit Bandini Productions—and star in the film adaptation of The Long Home. Josh Hutcherson was officially cast as the lead, Nathan Winer on May 1, 2015. Tim Blake Nelson was also officially cast on May 1, 2015. Originally slated for 2017, it has yet to be released in any form as of 2021.

References

External links
Hear William Gay read from Twilight
Read an excerpt from Twilight
Hear William Gay read from Provinces of Night
Read an excerpt from Provinces of Night
Ford Foundation 2007 Fellows
United States Artists Arts Advocacy Organization.

1941 births
2012 deaths
20th-century American novelists
21st-century American novelists
American male novelists
United States Navy personnel of the Vietnam War
American writers about music
United States Navy sailors
American male short story writers
People from Hohenwald, Tennessee
American male essayists
20th-century American short story writers
21st-century American short story writers
20th-century American essayists
21st-century American essayists
Ford Foundation fellowships
20th-century American male writers
21st-century American male writers